CSM Constantine is an Algerian professional basketball team located in Constantine, Algeria. The team currently competes in the Algerian Basketball Championship.

Notable players
 Abderamane Mbaindiguim

References

External links
Presentation at Africabasket.com

Basketball teams in Algeria
Sports teams in Algeria
Basketball teams established in 2012